Waitomo District is a territorial authority, located in the Waikato region, at the north of the King Country area in the North Island of New Zealand. A small part of the district, the locality of Tiroa, however, lies in the Manawatū-Whanganui region.

The District covers the west coast from Te Maika, on Kawhia Harbour, to the north of Taharoa, to Mokau in the south and extends inland to Maniaiti / Benneydale and Mount Pureora.

Demographics

Waitomo District had a population of 9,303 at the 2018 New Zealand census, an increase of 396 people (4.4%) since the 2013 census, and a decrease of 135 people (−1.4%) since the 2006 census. There were 3,384 households, comprising 4,695 males and 4,605 females, giving a sex ratio of 1.02 males per female. The median age was 38.2 years (compared with 37.4 years nationally), with 2,082 people (22.4%) aged under 15 years, 1,701 (18.3%) aged 15 to 29, 4,071 (43.8%) aged 30 to 64, and 1,446 (15.5%) aged 65 or older.

Ethnicities were 63.5% European/Pākehā, 44.8% Māori, 3.7% Pacific peoples, 3.7% Asian, and 1.3% other ethnicities. People may identify with more than one ethnicity.

The percentage of people born overseas was 10.4, compared with 27.1% nationally.

Although some people chose not to answer the census's question about religious affiliation, 53.2% had no religion, 31.6% were Christian, 3.8% had Māori religious beliefs, 0.6% were Hindu, 0.6% were Muslim, 0.3% were Buddhist and 1.2% had other religions.

Of those at least 15 years old, 783 (10.8%) people had a bachelor's or higher degree, and 1,932 (26.8%) people had no formal qualifications. The median income was $27,300, compared with $31,800 nationally. 684 people (9.5%) earned over $70,000 compared to 17.2% nationally. The employment status of those at least 15 was that 3,597 (49.8%) people were employed full-time, 1,263 (17.5%) were part-time, and 282 (3.9%) were unemployed.

District council 
No other village in the district has a population of over 500. The Waitomo district was declared in 1976. The current district mayor is John Robertson, who defeated incumbent Brian Hanna in the 2019 New Zealand local elections.

Economy 

The district is a rural, predominantly dairy farming, region. The area's main industries include sheep farming, forestry, and limestone quarrying. The area is known for the popular Waitomo Caves, a karstic system with stalactites, stalagmites and glowworms 12 kilometres northwest of Te Kuiti. Waitomo also has an Edwardian hotel, built in 1908 and added onto in the 1930s. The hotel overlooks the Waitomo Caves village.

Attractions 

Te Anga Road, a winding road from State Highway 3 in the Marokopa River area, leads past the Waitomo Caves, Mangapohue Natural Bridge, Piripiri Caves, and Marokopa Falls. Numerous other limestone caves are found throughout the Waitomo district.

References

External links

 Waitomo District Council
 Destination Waitomo
 Hamilton & Waikato Regional Tourism